"Panic Room" is a song by Antiguan singer-songwriter Au/Ra and British production duo CamelPhat. It was originally released as a solo song by Au/Ra in February 2018 before being remixed by CamelPhat and released credited to both artists on 29 March 2018. The remixed version charted in multiple countries, including the UK, where it reached the top 40 and was certified Platinum a year later. Au/Ra's original version without Camelphat has now sold more than the remixed version and was certified Gold (in excess of 500,000 copies) in the USA.

Background
Au/Ra wrote the song about experiencing anxiety.

Music video
The music video for the song featured a spaceship-like area. In this area, people are running away to containment chambers after finding a dead body to protect themselves. Originally, the singer follows the others, but reveals to the audience that she was the one who attacked. She enters a chamber and her eyes flash red. The video was released February 21, 2018, on the singer's YouTube channel.

Track listings

Charts

Weekly charts

Year-end charts

Certifications

References

2018 singles
2018 songs
Au/Ra songs
CamelPhat songs
Songs written by Au/Ra
Songs written by Andrew Frampton (songwriter)